Cannabis is illegal in Mongolia. In 2008, most of the cannabis seized in Mongolia was grown locally, though some was produced in Russia.

History
Cannabis may have been introduced to Mongolia by the Scythians, and historically was used for medical and shamanic purposes.

References

Mongolia
Drugs in Mongolia